The 1988 Peach Bowl, part of the 1987–88 bowl game season, took place on January 2, 1988, at Atlanta–Fulton County Stadium in Atlanta, Georgia. The competing teams were the Tennessee Volunteers, representing the Southeastern Conference (SEC), and the Indiana Hoosiers of the Big Ten Conference (Big Ten). In what was the first ever meeting between the schools, Tennessee was victorious by a final score of 27–22.

Teams

Tennessee

The 1987 Tennessee squad finished the regular season with a tie against Auburn and losses to Alabama and Boston College en route to an overall record of nine wins, two losses and one tie (9–2–1). In mid-November, the Volunteers accepted an invitation to play in the Peach Bowl. The appearance marked the second for Tennessee in the Peach Bowl, and their 29th overall bowl game.

Indiana

The 1987 Indiana squad finished the regular season with losses at Kentucky, Iowa and Michigan State en route to an overall record of eight wins and three losses (8–3). In mid-November, the Hoosiers accepted an invitation to play in the Peach Bowl. Their appearance marked the first for Indiana in the Peach Bowl, and their fourth overall bowl game.

Game summary
Tennessee scored first when Reggie Cobb scored on a six-yard touchdown run midway through the first quarter that gave the Volunteers an early 7–0 lead. Later in the quarter, Indiana cut the lead to 7–3 after a 52-yard field goal by Pete Stoyanovich, but Tennessee responded on their next possession with a 45-yard Jeff Francis touchdown pass to Anthony Miller that made the score 14–3 at the end of the first. The Volunteers took a commanding 21–3 lead early in the second quarter on a 15-yard Miller touchdown pass to  	Terence Cleveland, but the Hoosiers then started their comeback that eventually resulted in a 22–21 lead. After a Cobb fumble gave Indiana possession on their own nine-yard line, they proceeded to drive 91-yards with their first touchdown scored by Ernest Jones on a 43-yard Dave Schnell pass that made the halftime score 21–10. In the third, Anthony Thompson scored on a 12-yard run and Tim Jorden scored on another 12-yard run in the fourth that gave the Hoosiers a 22–21 lead after a pair of missed two-point conversions. Tennessee then scored the game-winning touchdown with just under two minutes remaining in the game on a nine-yard Cobb touchdown run that made the final score 27–22. For their individual performances, Cobb was recognized as the offensive MVP and Van Waiters was recognized as the defensive MVP of the game.

References

Peach Bowl
Peach Bowl
Indiana Hoosiers football bowl games
Tennessee Volunteers football bowl games
January 1988 sports events in the United States
1988 in sports in Georgia (U.S. state)